is a live video by Japanese singer/songwriter Chisato Moritaka. Recorded live at the Utsonomiya City Cultural Hall in Utsunomiya, Tochigi on November 29, 1990 and at the Hamamatsu Civic Center in Hamamatsu, Shizuoka on August 28, 1990, the video was released on May 27, 2015 by Warner Music Japan on Blu-ray and DVD formats; each with an audio CD of the Utsunomiya show. A limited edition Blu-ray boxed set includes an 84-page photobook, a 52-page booklet chronicling Moritaka's 1990 tour, a 2015–2016 calendar, a special edition portrait with download code, a notebook, and a replica backstage pass.

The video peaked at No. 27 on Oricon's Blu-ray chart and at No. 80 on Oricon's DVD chart.

Track listing 
All lyrics are written by Chisato Moritaka, except where indicated; all music is composed by Hideo Saitō, except where indicated.

Personnel 
 Chisato Moritaka – vocals, keyboards
 The Janet Jacksons
 Yasuaki Maejima – keyboards
 Shin Kōno – keyboards, guitar
 Hiroyoshi Matsuo – guitar
 Masafumi Yokoyama – bass
 Makoto Yoshiwara – drums

Charts

References

External links 
  (Chisato Moritaka)
  (Warner Music Japan)
 

2015 live albums
2015 video albums
Chisato Moritaka video albums
Japanese-language live albums
Japanese-language video albums
Live video albums
Warner Music Japan albums